Liseleje, a town in Denmark.

Liseleje may also refer to:

 9272 Liseleje, a minor planet